, there were about 1,500 electric vehicles in Alaska. , about 0.1% of new vehicle registrations in Alaska were electric.

In 2021, Alaska was ranked by Bumper.com as the worst state in the U.S. for electric vehicle ownership.

, Alaska is the only state in the U.S. where a company other than Tesla—in this case, Nissan—comprises a plurality of the state's electric vehicle market.

Charging stations
, there were 48 charging stations in Alaska.

The state received its first public DC charger in August 2021.

By region

Anchorage

Juneau
, Juneau has the highest rate of electric vehicle ownership in the state, and one of the highest in the country.

References

Alaska
Road transportation in Alaska